Jetport may refer to:
An alternative term for airport
Portland International Jetport, the largest airport commonly known as Jetport, serving Portland, Maine

See also